The 2011–12 Biathlon World Cup – World Cup 2 is held in Hochfilzen, Austria, from 9 December until 11 December 2011.

Schedule of events 
The time schedule of the event stands below

Medal winners

Men

Women

Achievements

 Best performance for all time

 , 2nd place in Sprint
 , 7th place in Sprint
 , 47th place in Sprint
 , 49th place in Sprint
 , 95th place in Sprint
 , 104th place in Sprint
 , 18th place in Pursuit
 , 10th place in Sprint
 , 27th place in Sprint
 , 35th place in Sprint
 , 44th place in Sprint and 27th in Pursuit
 , 83rd place in Sprint

 First World Cup race

 , 10th place in Sprint
 , 23rd place in Sprint
 , 25th place in Sprint
 , 61st place in Sprint

References

External links

World Cup 2
2011 in Austrian sport
December 2011 sports events in Europe
2011-12 Biathlon World Cup
Sport in Tyrol (state)